{{Automatic taxobox
| image = Apogon kalasoma Ford 16.jpg
| image_caption = Lepidamia kalasoma
| taxon = Lepidamia
| authority = T. N. Gill, 1863
| type_species = Apogon kalosoma
| type_species_authority = Bleeker, 1852<ref name = CoF>{{Cof record|genid=3175|title=Lepidamia|access-date=21 September 2018}}</ref>
}}Lepidamia is a genus of fishes in the family Apogonidae, the cardinalfishes.

Species
The currently recognized species in this genus are:
 Lepidamia kalosoma (Bleeker, 1852) (pinstripe cardinalfish)
 Lepidamia multitaeniata (G. Cuvier, 1828) (smallscale cardinalfish)
 Lepidamia natalensis (Gilchrist & W. W. Thompson, 1908)
 Lepidamia omanensis'' (Gon & Mee, 1995) (Oman cardinalfish)

References

Apogoninae
Marine fish genera
Taxa named by Theodore Gill